The white-necked laughingthrush (Garrulax strepitans) is a species of bird in the family Leiothrichidae. It is found in Yunnan, Laos, Myanmar and Thailand. Its natural habitats are subtropical or tropical moist lowland forests and subtropical or tropical moist montane forests.

Description
The general plumage is a pale brownish-grey. The iris is dark, and the bill and legs are grey. It has a distinctive laughing call. It resembles the grey laughingthrush (Garrulax maesi) apart from the darker head.

Distribution and habitat
The white-necked laughingthrush is native to tropical southeastern Asia. Its range includes central and northern Thailand, eastern Myanmar, western Laos and Yunnan province in  southwestern China. It typically occurs in lowland and montane broad-leaved forest and scrubland.

Status
The white-necked laughingthrush has a very wide range and is described as fairly common, apart from in China where it is described as rare. The population trend is probably in decline because of habitat destruction, but the total population is large and the decline is not sufficiently rapid to cause concern. No other  threats have been identified and the International Union for Conservation of Nature (IUCN) has assessed the bird's conservation status as being of "least concern".

References

External links 
 
 

White-necked laughingthrush
Birds of Laos
Birds of Myanmar
Birds of Thailand
Birds of Yunnan
White-necked laughingthrush
White-necked laughingthrush
Taxonomy articles created by Polbot